Kian (also Romanized as Kīān) is a village in Qahab-e Shomali Rural District, in the Central District of Isfahan County, Isfahan Province, Iran. At the 2006 census, its population was 424, in 103 families.

References 

Populated places in Isfahan County